Cirsti Manor is a two-storey manor house built in 1886 in Neo-Gothic red brick style in the historical region of Vidzeme, northern Latvia.

Architecture 
Unusual to Neo-Gothic structures in Latvia, the hexagonal three-storey manor tower is detached from the main building.

See also
List of palaces and manor houses in Latvia

References

Manor houses in Latvia